Baxter is an unincorporated community in Henderson County, located in the U.S. state of Texas.

References

External links

Unincorporated communities in Henderson County, Texas
Unincorporated communities in Texas